Schmelzer is a surname. Derived forms of the name include Smelser, Smelcer, Schmeltzer, Smelzer, Smeltzer and Schmelzer, Schmeltzer. 

There is some dispute regarding the origin of this name.

Notable people with the surname include:

Dave Schmelzer (born 1962), American writer and playwright
Deirdre Smeltzer (born 1964), American mathematician
Devin Smeltzer (born 1995), American baseball player
Heinrich Schmelzer (1914–1985), German SS officer
Johann Heinrich Schmelzer (c.1620–1680), Austrian composer and violinist
Marcel Schmelzer (born 1988), German footballer
Norbert Schmelzer (1921–2008), Dutch politician

German-language surnames